The 2016 Horizon League baseball tournament was held from May 25 through 28.  The top six finishers of the league's seven teams met in the double-elimination tournament held at the home field of the regular season champion.  The winner of the tournament earned the conference's automatic bid to the 2016 NCAA Division I baseball tournament.

Seeding and format
The league's teams were seeded one through six based on winning percentage, using conference games only.  They then played a double-elimination tournament.  The teams seeded three through six played in play-in games. The winners of those games joined seeds one and two to play a double-elimination tournament. The seventh place team did not qualify for the tournament.

Bracket

Play-in games

Remaining bracket

References

Tournament
Horizon League Baseball Tournament
Horizon League baseball tournament
Horizon League baseball tournament
College sports tournaments in Ohio
Fairborn, Ohio
Baseball competitions in Ohio
Tourist attractions in Greene County, Ohio